The I-11 was a two-seat civil utility aircraft manufactured in Spain in the 1950s.  Originally designed by the Spanish aircraft company Iberavia, its first (of two) prototype flew on 16 July 1951.  It was a low-wing monoplane of conventional configuration with fixed, tricycle undercarriage and a large, bubble canopy over the two side-by-side seats.  Flight characteristics were found to be pleasing, but before plans could be made for mass production, Iberavia was acquired by AISA.

The new management decided to continue with development, but made a few changes to the design, reducing the size of the canopy, and replacing the undercarriage with a taildragger arrangement.  This configuration entered production in 1952 with an order from the Director General for Civil Aviation for 70 aircraft for use in Spain's aeroclubs.  The Spanish Air Force then ordered 125 for use in training and liaison roles.

The Air Force then requested 200 aircraft built with the seats in tandem, which were designated I-115 by the manufacturers powered by a 112 kW (150 hp) ENMA Tigre inverted air-cooled engine.

Variants
I-11 2 prototypes by Iberavia, tricycle undercarriage
I-11B Production examples by AISA
AISA I-115 Tandem-seat version.

Operators

Spanish Air Force

Specifications (I-11B)

References

 
 
 
 Fundació Aeronàutica Mallorquina website

I-011
Single-engined tractor aircraft
Low-wing aircraft
1950s Spanish civil utility aircraft
Aircraft first flown in 1951